Tim is the third and final studio album by Swedish DJ and producer Tim Bergling, known by the stage name Avicii, released on 6 June 2019. It is his sole posthomous album release following his death a year earlier. It includes the single "SOS", which was released on 10 April 2019. All profits from sales of the album go towards the Tim Bergling Foundation, set up following Avicii's suicide, for mental health awareness.

Background
Avicii's third album was first mentioned in late 2016 after he signed with Universal Sweden, when it was said that his next album would be released in 2017. From 13 July to 2 August, Avicii began sharing teasers for new music and later released Avīci (01) on 11 August 2017 with a total of six tracks. In an interview, he stated that (01) was the first of three EPs, with his full third album to be released alongside the third EP. Recording for the album resumed in late 2017. During March 2018, Avicii continued to share updates via Instagram and other streaming sites of different IDs and demos being put together for the album, including what would become "Hold the Line", "Bad Reputation", "Tough Love", "Ain't a Thing", and "Fades Away", amongst other demos. According to Kristoffer Fogelmark, the track "Never Leave Me" was the last track Avicii worked on, finished only two days before he left for Oman.

Following Avicii's death in April 2018, a representative said the following month that there were "no plans" to release any new material in the immediate future. In April 2019, it was announced that collaborators were enlisted to help finish the work on the album. A team of writers and producers made an album described as containing elements of "psychedelia, Arabian music, sounds of the Caribbean and more". The album's track listing was chosen from 16 possible songs. On 1 and 2 June 2019, fans were given a chance to listen to the album 4–5 days early by going to music cubes in various locations around the world.

Singles
The first single to promote the album, "SOS", was released on 10 April 2019. A "Fan Memories" video for "SOS", showing quotes from fans about the impact Avicii had on them, was released the same day. "SOS" debuted at number one on the singles chart in Sweden on two days of sales.

"Tough Love" was released as the second single for the album on 9 May 2019. The music video came out on 14 May 2019. "Tough Love" samples A.R. Rahman's track "Banarasiya" from the movie Raanjhanaa (2013).

"Heaven" featuring vocals from Coldplay lead singer Chris Martin was released as the third single for the album on 6 June 2019. The music video, called a "tribute video", which used clips of Avicii in Madagascar (following his final concert), was released on 24 June 2019.

"Fades Away" was released as the fourth single on 5 December 2019.  While the album version features vocals from Noonie Bao, the single version features vocals from Costa Rican singer MishCatt to coincide with the Avicii Tribute Concert for Mental Health Awareness where she performed it live.

Critical reception
{{Album ratings
| MC = 58/100
| rev1 = NME
| rev1score = <ref>{{Cite web |url=https://www.nme.com/reviews/album/avicii-tim |title=Avicii – 'TIM' review |last=Moore |first=Sam|date=7 June 2019 |website=NME |access-date=7 June 2019}}</ref>
| rev2 = Rolling Stone| rev2score = 
}}
The album received mixed reviews. At Metacritic, which assigns a normalized rating out of 100 to reviews from mainstream critics, the album received an average score of 58, based on four reviews, which indicates "mixed or average reviews".

Track listing

Notes
  signifies a co-producer
 Avicii is credited throughout by his legal name, Tim Bergling
 "Heart Upon My Sleeve" is originally an instrumental track from Avicii's album True.
 "SOS" contains an interpolation of "No Scrubs" by TLC, written by Tameka Cottle, Kandi Burruss, and Kevin "She'kspere" Briggs.
 "Freak" samples the song "Stay with Me", originally written and performed by Sam Smith (which samples Tom Petty's "I Won't Back Down"), and "Sukiyaki", originally sung by Kyu Sakamoto and Written by Ei Rokusuke.

Personnel
Adapted from Billboard''.

Production
 Avicii – production , vocal production , programming , drum programming 
 Vargas & Lagola – production , vocal production , programming 
 Carl Falk – production , vocal production , programming 
 Albin Nedler – production , vocal production , programming 
 Kristoffer Fogelmark – production , vocal production , programming 
 Sebastian Furrer – programming 
 Lucas von Bahder – production 
 Marcus Thunberg Wessel – production , vocal production
 Ash Pournouri – co-production 

Technical
 Marcus Thunberg Wessel – engineering 
 Richard "Segal" Huredia – engineering 
 Kevin Grainger – mixing and mastering 

Instruments
 Avicii – keyboards , bass guitar 
 Salem Al Fakir – guitar , bass guitar , strings , violin , vocals 
 Vincent Pontare – drums , vocals 
 Chris Martin – guitar , vocals 
 Albin Nedler – keyboards , guitar 
 Kristoffer "Bonn" Fogelmark – keyboards , guitar , vocals 
 Aloe Blacc – vocals 
 Agnes – vocals 
 Carl Falk – keyboards 
 Joe Janiak – vocals 
 Zachary Hannah – vocals 
 Wayne Sermon – guitar 
 Dan Reynolds – vocals 
 Noonie Bao – vocals

Charts

Weekly charts

Year-end charts

Certifications

References

2019 albums
Avicii albums
Albums published posthumously
Charity albums
Dance-pop albums by Swedish artists